This article is about music-related events in 1879.

Specific locations
1879 in Norwegian music

Events 
January 1 – The Violin Concerto of Johannes Brahms is premiered in Leipzig. Joseph Joachim was the soloist with Brahms conducting. 
 December 31 – Gilbert and Sullivan's comic opera The Pirates of Penzance opens at the Fifth Avenue Theatre in New York City (following a token performance the day before for U.K. copyright reasons in Paignton, Devon).
 Engelbert Humperdinck becomes the first winner of the Mendelssohn Award awarded by the Mendelssohn Stiftung (foundation) of Berlin.
 The Monte Carlo Philharmonic Orchestra gains a permanent home at the Garnier Palace.

Published popular music 
 "Oh, Dem Golden Slippers" by James A. Bland
 "In the Morning By the Bright Light" by James A. Bland
 "My Visit to the Opera" by Joseph P. Skelly
 "Some Day I'll Wander Back Again", words by Arthur W. French, music by William A. Huntley

Classical music 
Henri Duparc – Le Manoir de Rosemonde
Gabriel Fauré – Berceuse, for violin and piano
César Franck – Piano Quintet
Carl Goldmark 
Penthesilea, Op.31
Piano Trio No.2, Op.33
Asger Hamerik – Concert Romance for Cello and Piano
Stephen Heller 
4 Mazurkas, Op.148
20 Preludes, Op.150
Hans Huber 
10 Ländler vom Luzerner See, Op.47
Eine Lustspiel-Ouverture, Op.50
Franz Lachner – Elegie for Flute and Organ
Max Meyer-Olbersleben – Ballade, Op.9
Pablo de Sarasate – Spanish Dances for violin and piano, Book II
Bedřich Smetana – Ten Czech Dances, for piano
Charles-Marie Widor – Symphony for Organ No. 5

Opera 
Giovanni Bottesini – Ero e Leandro
Emmanuel Chabrier – Une éducation manquée, premiered May 1 in Paris
Miguel Marqués – Camoens
Viktor Nessler – Der Rattenfänger von Hameln
Camille Saint-Saëns – Étienne Marcel
Peter Tchaikovsky – Eugene Onegin

Musical theater 

 The Mulligan Guards' Ball Broadway production opens at the Comique Theatre on January 13 and runs for 153 performances
 The Mulligan Guards' Chowder Broadway production opens at the Comique Theatre on August 11 and runs for 112 performances
 The Mulligan Guards' Christmas Broadway production opens at the Comique Theatre on November 17 and runs for 104 performances

Births 
January 3 – Lina Abarbanell, German-American soprano (d. 1963)
January 10 – Armanda Degli Abbati, Italian opera singer (d. 1946)
January 26 – Hugo Riesenfeld, film music composer (died 1939)
February 9 – Natanael Berg, Swedish composer (d. 1957)
February 26 – Frank Bridge, composer (d. 1941)
April 1 – Louise Gunning, Broadway and vaudeville singer (d. 1960)
May 22 
Jean Cras, French composer (d. 1932)
Eastwood Lane, composer (d. 1951)
June 13 – Maria Gay, opera singer (d. 1943)
June 21 – Henry Creamer, US songwriter (d. 1930)
July 5
Philippe Gaubert, composer (d. 1941)
Wanda Landowska, harpsichordist (d. 1959)
July 9 – Ottorino Respighi, composer (d. 1936)
August 1 – Eva Tanguay, singer, vaudeville star (d. 1947)
August 18 – Gus Edwards, Prussian-born US songwriter and entertainer (d. 1945)
August 31 – Alma Mahler, born Alma Schindler, Viennese-born composer and wife of Gustav Mahler (d. 1964)
September 29 – Willem Willeke, Dutch cellist and music editor (died 1950)
September 30 – Henri Casadesus, violist and music publisher (d. 1947)
October 12 – Chris Smith, composer (d. 1949)
October 13 – Leopold Weninger, composer (died 1940)
October 18 – Grzegorz Fitelberg, Polish conductor, violinist and composer (d. 1953)
October 21 – Joseph Canteloube, composer (d. 1957)
November 2 – Ramón Montoya, Spanish flamenco guitarist (d. 1949)
December 1 – Beth Slater Whitson, US lyric writer (d. 1930)
December 4 – Hamilton Harty, composer (d. 1941)
December 7 – Rudolf Friml, pianist and composer of operettas and musicals (d. 1972)
December 19 – Otto Olsson, Swedish composer (d. 1964)
December 26 – Julius Weismann, German conductor and composer (d. 1950)

Deaths 
January 8 – Ferdo Livadić, composer (born 1799)
February 20 – John Orlando Parry, pianist, singer and comedian (born 1810)
April 9 – Ernst Friedrich Eduard Richter, music theorist
May 27 – E. S. Engelsberg, composer
June 3 – Frances Ridley Havergal, hymn-writer
July 6 – Henry Smart, organist and composer (born 1813)
August 4 – Adelaide Kemble, opera singer
September 12 – Peter Arnold Heise, composer
October 14 – Karl Anton Eckert, conductor and composer (born 1820)
November 30 – August Bournonville, Danish ballet-master and choreographer (born 1805)
December 24 – Anna Bochkoltz, German operatic soprano, voice teacher and composer (born 1815)

References 

 
19th century in music
Music by year